The World Athletics U20 Championships is a biennial world championships for the sport of athletics organised by the World Athletics, contested by athletes in the under-20 athletics age category (19 years old or younger on 31 December in the year of the competition.

The competition was launched as the IAAF World Junior Championships in Athletics in 1986 and renamed to IAAF World U20 Championships in November 2015. The current name was adapted with the name change of the sports governing body in 2019.

Anneisha McLaughlin-Whilby is the most successful athlete at the championships, having won one gold and four silver in individual and relay sprinting events between 2000 and 2004. Chris Nelloms, Davidson Ezinwa and Dexter Lee share the position of most successful male athlete, at four medals each.

Championships

The 2016 Championships were due to be held in Kazan, Russia until the IAAF's suspension of the All-Russia Athletic Federation, which prohibits Russia from hosting international competitions. This event was relocated.

All-time medal table
As of 2022 World Athletics U20 Championships.

Championships records

Men

Decathlon disciplines

Defunct events

Women

Heptathlon disciplines

Defunct event

Mixed

Disqualifications

Doping
Several athletes have been stripped of medals due to doping.

Age falsification
Two athletes subsequently lost their medals as a result of fraudulently misstating their age on official documents: Bahrain's 2006 steeplechase silver medallist Tareq Mubarak Taher and Morocco's Ahmed Baday (1998 5000 metres bronze). In addition to this, later analysis of Moses Kiptanui's age when having won the 1990 1500m showed he was marginally over age (aged 19 years, 315 days) at the time of his victory, though this result has not been rescinded.

Title defenses
Given the age limitations on the competition it is rare that athletes get the opportunity to defend previous individual titles. A total of 22 athletes have managed this feat, eight of them men and fourteen women. In addition to this Anita Weyermann won the 3000 m title after taking the 1500 m title two years earlier.

Doubles
A total of fifteen athletes have won two individual titles at the same championships (nine men, six women). The majority of these are sprint or long-distance combinations, although Andrew Howe (200 m and long jump), Margus Hunt (discus throw and shot put) and Morgan Lake (high jump and heptathlon) managed to win novel doubles. Many others achieved a double between an individual victory and being a member of a winning relay team.

See also
World Para Athletics Junior Championships

References

External links

 Official World Athletics U20 Championships website
 Results 1986 to 2021
 List of medallists at gbrathletics.com

 
Recurring sporting events established in 1986
World Junior Championships in Athletics
U20
Under-20 athletics competitions
World youth sports competitions
Biennial athletics competitions